Vanderhaeghe is a surname. Notable people with the surname include:

Guy Vanderhaeghe (born 1951), Canadian writer
Margaret Elizabeth Vanderhaeghe (1950–2012), Canadian artist
Yves Vanderhaeghe (born 1970), Belgian footballer and manager